Sathivada is a village and panchayat in Nellimarla mandal of Vizianagaram district, Andhra Pradesh, India.

Assembly constituency
Sathivada is an assembly constituency in Andhra Pradesh. There are 1,24,695 registered voters in Sathivada constituency in 1999 elections.

List of Elected Members:

1978 - Penumatsa Sambasiva Raju, Indian National Congress
1983 - Penumatsa Sambasiva Raju, Indian National Congress
1985 - Penumatsa Sambasiva Raju, Indian National Congress
1989 - Penumatsa Sambasiva Raju, Indian National Congress
1994 - Potnuru Suryanarayana, Telugu Desam Party
1999 - Penumatsa Sambasiva Raju, Indian National Congress
2004 - Penumatsa Sambasiva Raju, Indian National Congress

References

Villages in Vizianagaram district